Bear Island is an undeveloped  Sea Island in Colleton County, South Carolina, United States.  It is part of the ACE Basin estuarine reserve area and is a Wildlife Management Area that is managed by the South Carolina Department of Natural Resources (SCDNR).  The area is open to the public from early February to late October and is a popular spot for hiking, biking, birding, fishing, and hunting.  A wide variety of waterfowl species inhabit the area.  The area shuts down periodically for special hunts.

See also
ACE Basin
ACE Basin NERR
Sea Islands

External links
 Bear Island Wildlife Management Area

Protected areas of Colleton County, South Carolina
Islands of South Carolina
Wildlife management areas of South Carolina
South Carolina Sea Islands
Islands of Colleton County, South Carolina